Totebo is a locality situated in Västervik Municipality, Kalmar County, Sweden, with 239 inhabitants in 2010.

References 

Populated places in Kalmar County
Populated places in Västervik Municipality